Dave Smith (1886 – 29 May 1945) was a champion New Zealand-born boxer.

Smith had success as an amateur boxer in New Zealand, winning Otago and Dunedin titles, and moved to Australia in 1907 to pursue a professional career.

He became the heavyweight champion of Australia, and travelled to the United States looking for a shot at the world title. On his return to Australia he beat Bill Lang to win the Commonwealth heavyweight title. From Bondage to Freedom (1911) and In the Last Stride (1916).

Dave Smith died on 29 May 1945 in Sydney.

Dave was the 2009 Inductee for the Australian National Boxing Hall of Fame Old Timers category.

References

External links
Dave Smith boxing record at Boxrec
Article on Dave Smith at Sydney stadium

1886 births
1945 deaths
New Zealand male boxers
Heavyweight boxers
Australian male boxers
New Zealand emigrants to Australia